Manuela Ruef (born 11 June 1966) is a former Austrian alpine skier.

World Cup results
Top 10

Europa Cup results
Ruef has won an overall Europa Cup.

FIS Alpine Ski Europa Cup
Overall: 1986

References

External links
 
 

1966 births
Living people
Austrian female alpine skiers